The North Creek Bridge is a two lane bridge that carries New York State Route 28N across the Hudson River connecting North Creek in the Town of Johnsburg with the Town of Chester, New York built in 1930.

See also
List of fixed crossings of the Hudson River

References

Bridges over the Hudson River
Bridges completed in 1930
Road bridges in New York (state)
Steel bridges in the United States
Transportation buildings and structures in Warren County, New York
Truss bridges in the United States